Diana Iorgova (born April 11, 1971 in Ruse) is a Bulgarian sport shooter. She competed in the pistol shooting events at the Summer Olympics in 1992, 1996, and 2000. At the 1996 Olympics, she won the silver medal in the women's 25 metre pistol event.

Olympic results

References

1971 births
Living people
ISSF pistol shooters
Bulgarian female sport shooters
Shooters at the 1992 Summer Olympics
Shooters at the 1996 Summer Olympics
Shooters at the 2000 Summer Olympics
Olympic shooters of Bulgaria
Olympic silver medalists for Bulgaria
Medalists at the 1996 Summer Olympics
Olympic medalists in shooting
Sportspeople from Ruse, Bulgaria
20th-century Bulgarian women